Frank Stanmore may refer to:
Frank Stanmore (actor) (1877–1943), English actor
Frank Stanmore (rugby league) (1929–2005), Australian rugby league footballer